Serge Andreoni (born 15 March 1940) is a former member of the Senate of France who represented the Bouches-du-Rhône department from 2008 to 2014. He is a member of the Socialist Party.

References
Page on the Senate website 

1940 births
Living people
Socialist Party (France) politicians
French Senators of the Fifth Republic
Senators of Bouches-du-Rhône